Bijay Kumar Singh may refer to:

 Bijay Kumar Singh (Indian politician)
 Bijay Kumar Singh (Nepali politician)